Kyle Giersdorf, better known as Bugha, is an American professional esports player  who is best known for playing Fortnite Battle Royale. He came to fame after winning Fortnite World Cup 2019.

Early life 
Giersdorf lives in a town in Pennsylvania.

Giersdorf's nickname comes from his grandfather who used to call him Bugha when he was younger. He was first introduced to Fortnite when his father, also a gamer, told him about the "Save the World" game mode.

Professional career
After playing with team No Clout, Giersdorf signed with esports organization Sentinels on March 25, 2019, as a member of their Fortnite team. Giersdorf qualified and attended the 1st Annual Fortnite World Cup that took place on July 26–28, 2019. He competed for Solos that took place on the 28th. Giersdorf had the chance to play 6 matches against 99 other players who had also qualified. In the end, Giersdorf was 1st place with 59 points, almost doubling second-place winner psalm with 33 points. Kyle won $3,000,000 in Prize Money.

Epic Games gave Giersdorf a cosmetic outfit of his likeness in July 2021 as part of Fortnite's Icon Series. Other figures, such as football player Neymar and streamer Ninja, also have outfits.

Hack
Giersdorf's Twitter and Twitch were hacked hours after winning the Fortnite World Cup. He also hacked 100 gifted subscriptions to random streamers. His Twitter was also hacked, tweeting vulgar tweets and retweeted a tweet from said user.

Awards and nominations

Best Fortnite tournament placements 
Bugha's best placements include:

 1st Place Solo World Cup Qualifiers Week 1
 1st place Fortnite World Cup 2019
 1st Place Trio Cash Cup July 21, 2019
 1st Place Solo Cash Cup October 3, 2019
 1st Place Solo Cash Cup November 20, 2019
 5th Place FNCS Duos Grand Finals Chapter 2, Season 2
 1st Place Duos Cash Cup May 28, 2020
 1st Place Daily Trios Cup July 29, 2020
 4th Place FNCS Solos Grand Finals Chapter 2, Season 3
 4th Place DreamHack Online Open Finals August 2020
 2nd Place DreamHack Online Open Finals September 2020
 3rd Place FNCS Trios Grand Finals Chapter 2, Season 4
 5th Place FNCS Trios Grand Finals Chapter 2, Season 5
 1st Place FNCS Trios Grand Finals Chapter 2, Season 8
 1st Place FNCS Trios Grand Royale Finals Chapter 2, Season 8
 1st Place FNCS Duos Grand Finals Chapter 3, Season 1
 3rd Place FNCS Duos Grand Finals Chapter 3, Season 2
 2nd Place FNCS Duos Grand Finals Chapter 3, Season 3
Source:

See also 
 List of most-followed Twitch channels

References

External links 
Bugha on Instagram
Forbes Profile

Living people
American esports players
American YouTubers
Twitch (service) streamers
Fortnite
2002 births